Right to Life Australia is an organisation which advocates consistent life ethic positions in issues such as abortion, euthanasia and stem cell research. Margaret Tighe is the President of Right to Life Australia and Dr Toni Turnbull is Vice President. It is non-denominational and is not affiliated with any political party.

History

Right to Life was started in 1973 as Right to Life Victoria. It became Right to Life Australia in 2001.

It has run political campaigns and public demonstrations against these things.  Their members also lobby politicians, and give talks to schools and community groups.

Right to Life Australia organises an annual conference and a newsletter every two months, and funds Pregnancy Counselling Australia, which provides free counselling 24 hours per day, all year. 

The number for Pregnancy Counselling Australia is 1300 RESPECT.

Right to Life Australia was closely involved in the passing of the Euthanasia Bill 1996 and the Research Involving Human Embryos Bill 2002. In 2005 Right to Life made a statement on the Maria Korp case. Right to Life Australia supports Mothers Without Medicare, an organization that helps cover the cost of childbirth for financially insecure mothers.

Political campaigns
Right to Life Australia campaigned in the 2010 Victorian state election in the electorates of Mount Waverley, Seymour, Gippsland East, Frankston, Mordialloc, Bendigo East, Mitcham, Burwood and Essendon. In 2012 Right to Life Australia campaigned in the Algester and Springwood electorates and against members of EMILY's List in the 2012 Queensland State Election.

References

External links
Right to Life Australia
Prolife Victoria

Medical and health organisations based in Victoria (Australia)
Organizations established in 1973
1973 establishments in Australia
Anti-abortion organisations in Australia